The 1951 Philadelphia Phillies finished in fifth place. The team had won the 1950 National League pennant but in the United Press' annual preseason poll of sportswriters, only 18 out of 168 writers picked the team to repeat as pennant winners; the Giants received 81 votes and the Dodgers 55. Those two teams wound up tied, with the Phillies 23 games behind.

Offseason
 Prior to 1951 season: Ray Semproch was signed as an amateur free agent by the Phillies.

Preseason
The Phillies held spring training in Clearwater, Florida, stayed at the Fort Harrison Hotel, and played at Clearwater Athletic Field. It was the team's fifth successive year training in Clearwater.

Regular season

Season standings

Record vs. opponents

Notable transactions 
 June 11, 1951: Ted Kazanski was signed as an amateur free agent by the Phillies.

All-Star Game 
The 1951 All-Star Game was originally awarded to the Philadelphia Phillies. The City of Detroit was celebrating the 250th anniversary of its founding in 1701 and requested to host the year's All-Star Game. Although the National League was scheduled to host the game in '51, the game was moved to Detroit's Briggs Stadium to coincide with the city's celebration. The Phillies instead hosted the 1952 All-Star Game at Shibe Park.

Game log

|- style="background:#bfb"
| 1 || April 17 || @ Dodgers || 5–2 || Robin Roberts (1–0) || Carl Erskine (0–1) || None || 19,217 || 1–0
|- style="background:#fbb"
| 2 || April 18 || @ Dodgers || 3–4 || Preacher Roe (1–0) || Jim Konstanty (0–1) || None || 15,415 || 1–1
|- style="background:#bbb"
| – || April 19 || @ Dodgers || colspan=6 | Postponed (rain); Makeup: May 31
|- style="background:#fbb"
| 3 || April 20 || Braves || 1–2 || Max Surkont (1–0) || Ken Heintzelman (0–1) || None || 17,423 || 1–2
|- style="background:#fbb"
| 4 || April 21 || Braves || 6–8 || Vern Bickford (1–1) || Robin Roberts (1–1) || George Estock (1) || 10,945 || 1–3
|- style="background:#bfb"
| 5 || April 22 || Braves || 6–5 || Bubba Church (1–0) || Johnny Sain (0–1) || None || 11,261 || 2–3
|- style="background:#bfb"
| 6 || April 23 || Giants || 8–4 || Jocko Thompson (1–0) || Jim Hearn (1–1) || None || 17,283 || 3–3
|- style="background:#bfb"
| 7 || April 24 || Giants || 6–4 || Bob Miller (1–0) || Roger Bowman (0–1) || Jim Konstanty (1) || 16,274 || 4–3
|- style="background:#bfb"
| 8 || April 25 || Giants || 2–1 || Ken Heintzelman (1–1) || Larry Jansen (1–2) || None || 5,257 || 5–3
|- style="background:#bfb"
| 9 || April 26 || Dodgers || 2–0 || Robin Roberts (2–1) || Chris Van Cuyk (0–1) || None || 30,161 || 6–3
|- style="background:#fbb"
| 10 || April 27 || Dodgers || 5–11 || Joe Hatten (1–0) || Bubba Church (1–1) || Carl Erskine (1) || 9,267 || 6–4
|- style="background:#fbb"
| 11 || April 28 || @ Braves || 0–3 || Max Surkont (3–0) || Russ Meyer (0–1) || None || 7,848 || 6–5
|- style="background:#fbb"
| 12 || April 29 (1) || @ Braves || 0–1 || Vern Bickford (3–1) || Jocko Thompson (1–1) || None || see 2nd game || 6–6
|- style="background:#bfb"
| 13 || April 29 (2) || @ Braves || 10–9 || Leo Cristante (1–0) || Blix Donnelly (0–1) || Jim Konstanty (2) || 18,518 || 7–6
|-

|- style="background:#bfb"
| 14 || May 1 || Reds || 6–5 || Robin Roberts (3–1) || Willie Ramsdell (0–3) || None || 13,749 || 8–6
|- style="background:#fbb"
| 15 || May 2 || Reds || 4–6 || Ewell Blackwell (3–2) || Ken Heintzelman (1–2) || Frank Smith (2) || 3,417 || 8–7
|- style="background:#fbb"
| 16 || May 3 || Cardinals || 4–8 || Joe Presko (1–0) || Jim Konstanty (0–2) || None || 14,289 || 8–8
|- style="background:#bfb"
| 17 || May 4 || Cardinals || 6–4 || Russ Meyer (1–1) || Howie Pollet (0–1) || None || 14,232 || 9–8
|- style="background:#fbb"
| 18 || May 5 || Cardinals || 3–4 (11) || Gerry Staley (3–1) || Jim Konstanty (0–3) || None || 13,895 || 9–9
|- style="background:#bfb"
| 19 || May 6 (1) ||  Cubs || 5–4 || Bubba Church (2–1) || Frank Hiller (2–2) || None || see 2nd game || 10–9
|- style="background:#fbb"
| 20 || May 6 (2) || Cubs || 7–9 (10) || Johnny Klippstein (1–0) || Robin Roberts (3–2) || None || 20,998 || 10–10
|- style="background:#fbb"
| 21 || May 8 || Pirates || 3–9 || Mel Queen (2–1) || Ken Heintzelman (1–3) || Bill Werle (5) || 13,700 || 10–11
|- style="background:#bfb"
| 22 || May 9 || Pirates || 6–5 (10) || Jim Konstanty (1–3) || Joe Muir (0–2) || None || 14,134 || 11–11
|- style="background:#fbb"
| 23 || May 10 || Pirates || 0–2 || Murry Dickson (4–1) || Bubba Church (2–2) || None || 3,562 || 11–12
|- style="background:#bbb"
| – || May 11 || @ Giants || colspan=6 | Postponed (rain); Makeup: May 13 as a traditional double-header
|- style="background:#bfb"
| 24 || May 12 || @ Giants || 6–5 (10) || Jim Konstanty (2–3) || Dave Koslo (1–2) || None || 12,856 || 12–12
|- style="background:#fbb"
| 25 || May 13 (1) || @ Giants || 2–11 || Larry Jansen (3–3) || Jocko Thompson (1–2) || None || see 2nd game || 12–13
|- style="background:#fbb"
| 26 || May 13 (2) || @ Giants || 2–4 || Sal Maglie (4–2) || Ken Heintzelman (1–4) || None || 26,740 || 12–14
|- style="background:#bfb"
| 27 || May 15 || @ Cardinals || 5–4 || Russ Meyer (2–1) || Tom Poholsky (2–3) || Robin Roberts (1) || 13,837 || 13–14
|- style="background:#fbb"
| 28 || May 16 || @ Cardinals || 3–5 || Gerry Staley (5–3) || Bubba Church (2–3) || Al Brazle (1) || 9,117 || 13–15
|- style="background:#fbb"
| 29 || May 17 || @ Cardinals || 1–2 || Joe Presko (2–2) || Robin Roberts (3–3) || None || 9,754 || 13–16
|- style="background:#fbb"
| 30 || May 18 || @ Cubs || 9–18 || Dutch Leonard (1–0) || Leo Cristante (1–1) || None || 7,564 || 13–17
|- style="background:#bfb"
| 31 || May 19 || @ Cubs || 2–1 || Bubba Church (3–3) || Johnny Klippstein (2–1) || Jim Konstanty (3) || 20,811 || 14–17
|- style="background:#bfb"
| 32 || May 20 (1) || @ Pirates || 17–0 || Russ Meyer (3–1) || Murry Dickson (5–3) || None || see 2nd game || 15–17
|- style="background:#bfb"
| 33 || May 20 (2) || @ Pirates || 12–4 || Robin Roberts (4–3) || Erv Dusak (0–1) || None || 36,166 || 16–17
|- style="background:#bbb"
| – || May 22 || @ Reds || colspan=6 | Postponed (rain); Makeup: July 30
|- style="background:#fbb"
| 34 || May 23 || @ Reds || 3–4 (10) || Willie Ramsdell (3–4) || Jim Konstanty (2–4) || None || 2,647 || 16–18
|- style="background:#fbb"
| 35 || May 25 || Giants || 5–8 || George Spencer (2–1) || Bob Miller (1–1) || Sheldon Jones (3) || 21,082 || 16–19
|- style="background:#fbb"
| 36 || May 26 || Giants || 0–2 || Larry Jansen (4–4) || Robin Roberts (4–4) || None || 26,491 || 16–20
|- style="background:#fbb"
| 37 || May 27 || Giants || 0–2 || Sal Maglie (7–2) || Russ Meyer (3–2) || None || 9,090 || 16–21
|- style="background:#fbb"
| 38 || May 28 || Dodgers || 3–4 || Ralph Branca (2–1) || Ken Heintzelman (1–5) || None || 20,387 || 16–22
|- style="background:#fbb"
| 39 || May 30 (1) || Dodgers || 3–5 || Don Newcombe (5–2) || Robin Roberts (4–5) || None || see 2nd game || 16–23
|- style="background:#bfb"
| 40 || May 30 (2) || Dodgers || 9–5 || Bubba Church (4–3) || Clyde King (4–3) || None || 34,697 || 17–23
|- style="background:#fbb"
| 41 || May 31 || @ Dodgers || 3–4 || Carl Erskine (4–4) || Russ Meyer (3–3) || None || 18,662 || 17–24
|-

|- style="background:#bfb"
| 42 || June 1 || Cardinals || 7–3 || Jocko Thompson (2–2) || Gerry Staley (7–4) || Jim Konstanty (4) || 16,372 || 18–24
|- style="background:#bfb"
| 43 || June 2 || Cardinals || 5–2 || Ken Heintzelman (2–5) || Tom Poholsky (4–4) || None || 4,874 || 19–24
|- style="background:#bfb"
| 44 || June 3 (1) || Pirates || 11–2 || Robin Roberts (5–5) || Mel Queen (3–5) || None || see 2nd game || 20–24
|- style="background:#bfb"
| 45 || June 3 (2) || Pirates || 8–3 || Bubba Church (5–3) || Murry Dickson (6–5) || None || 19,325 || 21–24
|- style="background:#fbb"
| 46 || June 4 || Pirates || 4–12 || Bob Friend (1–1) || Russ Meyer (3–4) || Murry Dickson (1) || 2,343 || 21–25
|- style="background:#fbb"
| 47 || June 5 || Cubs || 2–3 || Bob Rush (3–2) || Jim Konstanty (2–5) || None || 10,937 || 21–26
|- style="background:#bfb"
| 48 || June 6 || Cubs || 9–1 || Robin Roberts (6–5) || Bob Schultz (3–4) || None || 10,048 || 22–26
|- style="background:#bfb"
| 49 || June 7 || Cubs || 7–1 || Bubba Church (6–3) || Johnny Klippstein (3–2) || None || 3,257 || 23–26
|- style="background:#bbb"
| – || June 8 || Reds || colspan=6 | Postponed (rain); Makeup: July 17 as a traditional double-header
|- style="background:#fbb"
| 50 || June 9 || Reds || 4–5 || Ewell Blackwell (7–4) || Jocko Thompson (2–3) || None || 4,093 || 23–27
|- style="background:#bbb"
| – || June 10 (1) || Reds || colspan=6 | Postponed (rain); Makeup: July 18 as a traditional double-header
|- style="background:#bbb"
| – || June 10 (2) || Reds || colspan=6 | Postponed (rain); Makeup: August 27 as a traditional double-header
|- style="background:#bfb"
| 51 || June 12 || @ Cubs || 6–5 || Milo Candini (1–0) || Frank Hiller (4–5) || Jim Konstanty (5) || 9,289 || 24–27
|- style="background:#bfb"
| 52 || June 13 || @ Cubs || 5–0 || Robin Roberts (7–5) || Johnny Klippstein (3–3) || None || 7,889 || 25–27
|- style="background:#bfb"
| 53 || June 14 || @ Cubs || 11–3 || Russ Meyer (4–4) || Bob Rush (4–3) || None || 6,896 || 26–27
|- style="background:#fbb"
| 54 || June 15 || @ Cardinals || 2–10 || Max Lanier (3–5) || Ken Heintzelman (2–6) || Cloyd Boyer (1) || 9,320 || 26–28
|- style="background:#fbb"
| 55 || June 16 || @ Cardinals || 5–6 || Al Brazle (1–0) || Jocko Thompson (2–4) || Tom Poholsky (1) || 12,932 || 26–29
|- style="background:#fbb"
| 56 || June 17 || @ Cardinals || 4–5 (10) || Gerry Staley (8–6) || Russ Meyer (4–5) || None || 22,751 || 26–30
|- style="background:#bfb"
| 57 || June 19 || @ Pirates || 9–2 || Russ Meyer (5–5) || Murry Dickson (8–7) || None || 16,601 || 27–30
|- style="background:#bfb"
| 58 || June 20 || @ Pirates || 1–0 || Bubba Church (7–3) || Bob Friend (1–4) || None || 12,751 || 28–30
|- style="background:#bfb"
| 59 || June 21 || @ Pirates || 10–5 || Robin Roberts (8–5) || Paul LaPalme (1–4) || None || 5,682 || 29–30
|- style="background:#fbb"
| 60 || June 22 || @ Reds || 2–3 || Harry Perkowski (2–1) || Jocko Thompson (2–5) || Frank Smith (6) || 8,973 || 29–31
|- style="background:#fbb"
| 61 || June 23 || @ Reds || 1–8 || Willie Ramsdell (5–7) || Ken Heintzelman (2–7) || Frank Smith (7) || 4,343 || 29–32
|- style="background:#fbb"
| 62 || June 24 (1) || @ Reds || 1–3 || Ken Raffensberger (7–7) || Robin Roberts (8–6) || None || see 2nd game || 29–33
|- style="background:#bfb"
| 63 || June 24 (2) || @ Reds || 4–2 || Ken Heintzelman (3–7) || Frank Smith (4–2) || Jocko Thompson (1) || 19,005 || 30–33
|- style="background:#bfb"
| 64 || June 26 || Braves || 7–0 || Bubba Church (8–3) || Johnny Sain (4–8) || None || 18,802 || 31–33
|- style="background:#bbb"
| – || June 27 || Braves || colspan=6 | Postponed (rain); Makeup: August 7 as a traditional double-header
|- style="background:#bfb"
| 65 || June 28 || Braves || 3–2 (10) || Jim Konstanty (3–5) || Warren Spahn (8–6) || None || 5,119 || 32–33
|- style="background:#bfb"
| 66 || June 29 || @ Dodgers || 3–2 || Robin Roberts (9–6) || Erv Palica (1–3) || None || 24,566 || 33–33
|- style="background:#fbb"
| 67 || June 30 || @ Dodgers || 8–14 || Carl Erskine (7–7) || Bubba Church (8–4) || None || 8,096 || 33–34
|-

|- style="background:#fbb"
| 68 || July 1 || @ Dodgers || 0–2 || Don Newcombe (11–4) || Russ Meyer (5–6) || None || 18,074 || 33–35
|- style="background:#fbb"
| 69 || July 2 || @ Giants || 3–4 || Jim Hearn (7–5) || Ken Heintzelman (3–8) || George Spencer (2) || 23,046 || 33–36
|- style="background:#fbb"
| 70 || July 3 || @ Giants || 8–9 (13) || Larry Jansen (11–6) || Jocko Thompson (2–6) || None || 9,295 || 33–37
|- style="background:#bfb"
| 71 || July 4 (1) || @ Braves || 4–1 || Robin Roberts (10–6) || Chet Nichols (3–3) || None || see 2nd game || 34–37
|- style="background:#bfb"
| 72 || July 4 (2) || @ Braves || 3–1 || Bubba Church (9–4) || Dave Cole (0–2) || None || 13,010 || 35–37
|- style="background:#fbb"
| 73 || July 5 || @ Braves || 6–7 (11) || Chet Nichols (4–3) || Jim Konstanty (3–6) || None || 2,902 || 35–38
|- style="background:#fbb"
| 74 || July 6 || Dodgers || 2–6 || Carl Erskine (8–8) || Russ Meyer (5–7) || None || 31,178 || 35–39
|- style="background:#fbb"
| 75 || July 7 || Dodgers || 2–6 || Ralph Branca (7–2) || Robin Roberts (10–7) || None || 30,695 || 35–40
|- style="background:#fbb"
| 76 || July 8 || Dodgers || 4–6 (10) || Erv Palica (2–3) || Jim Konstanty (3–7) || Clyde King (3) || 26,071 || 35–41
|- style="background:#bbcaff;"
| – || July 10 ||colspan="7" |1951 Major League Baseball All-Star Game at Briggs Stadium in Detroit
|- style="background:#bfb"
| 77 || July 12 || Pirates || 11–6 || Russ Meyer (6–7) || Murry Dickson (10–10) || None || 10,618 || 36–41
|- style="background:#bfb"
| 78 || July 13 || Pirates || 3–2 || Robin Roberts (11–7) || Howie Pollet (2–6) || None || 7,786 || 37–41
|- style="background:#bfb"
| 79 || July 14 || Pirates || 2–0 || Bubba Church (10–4) || Vern Law (3–3) || None || 4,106 || 38–41
|- style="background:#fbb"
| 80 || July 15 (1) || Cardinals || 4–7 || Jack Crimian (1–0) || Ken Johnson (0–1) || Al Brazle (2) || see 2nd game || 38–42
|- style="background:#bfb"
| 81 || July 15 (2) || Cardinals || 6–4 || Ken Heintzelman (4–8) || Tom Poholsky (4–7) || Jim Konstanty (6) || 25,551 || 39–42
|- style="background:#bfb"
| 82 || July 16 || Cardinals || 5–2 || Russ Meyer (7–7) || Gerry Staley (12–9) || Jim Konstanty (7) || 11,502 || 40–42
|- style="background:#fbb"
| 83 || July 17 (1) || Reds || 8–9 || Howie Fox (6–4) || Robin Roberts (11–8) || Frank Smith (10) || see 2nd game || 40–43
|- style="background:#bfb"
| 84 || July 17 (2) || Reds || 10–0 || Jocko Thompson (3–6) || Ken Raffensberger (9–10) || None || 18,081 || 41–43
|- style="background:#fbb"
| 85 || July 18 (1) || Reds || 0–2 || Willie Ramsdell (8–9) || Bubba Church (10–5) || None || see 2nd game || 41–44
|- style="background:#bfb"
| 86 || July 18 (2) || Reds || 1–0 || Ken Johnson (1–1) || Herm Wehmeier (1–4) || None || 15,810 || 42–44
|- style="background:#bfb"
| 87 || July 20 || Cubs || 4–3 (11) || Jim Konstanty (4–7) || Bob Rush (5–5) || None || 10,642 || 43–44
|- style="background:#bfb"
| 88 || July 21 || Cubs || 5–0 || Robin Roberts (12–8) || Turk Lown (2–5) || None || 5,515 || 44–44
|- style="background:#fbb"
| 89 || July 22 (1) || Cubs || 7–8 (14) || Dutch Leonard (8–3) || Jim Konstanty (4–8) || None || see 2nd game || 44–45
|- style="background:#bfb"
| 90 || July 22 (2) || Cubs || 3–2 (12) || Bubba Church (11–5) || Monk Dubiel (0–1) || None || 13,877 || 45–45
|- style="background:#fbb"
| 91 || July 24 || @ Cardinals || 5–9 || Harry Brecheen (6–1) || Russ Meyer (7–8) || None || 10,874 || 45–46
|- style="background:#bfb"
| 92 || July 25 || @ Cardinals || 2–0 || Robin Roberts (13–8) || Cliff Chambers (6–9) || None || 10,239 || 46–46
|- style="background:#bfb"
| 93 || July 26 || @ Cardinals || 7–0 || Ken Johnson (2–1) || Tom Poholsky (4–9) || None || 9,881 || 47–46
|- style="background:#bfb"
| 94 || July 27 || @ Cubs || 2–0 || Bubba Church (12–5) || Frank Hiller (6–8) || None || 5,206 || 48–46
|- style="background:#bfb"
| 95 || July 28 || @ Cubs || 1–0 || Russ Meyer (8–8) || Cal McLish (2–4) || None || 10,806 || 49–46
|- style="background:#fbb"
| 96 || July 29 (1) || @ Cubs || 4–5 || Bob Kelly (2–0) || Jim Konstanty (4–9) || None || see 2nd game || 49–47
|- style="background:#fbb"
| 97 || July 29 (2) || @ Cubs || 6–8 || Dutch Leonard (9–3) || Bubba Church (12–6) || Monk Dubiel (1) || 25,840 || 49–48
|- style="background:#fbb"
| 98 || July 30 || @ Reds || 5–6 || Frank Smith (5–2) || Jim Konstanty (4–10) || None || 4,034 || 49–49
|- style="background:#bfb"
| 99 || July 31 || @ Reds || 7–5 || Andy Hansen (1–0) || Frank Smith (5–3) || Ken Heintzelman (1) || 13,135 || 50–49
|-

|- style="background:#fbb"
| 100 || August 1 || @ Reds || 0–1 || Ken Raffensberger (11–11) || Russ Meyer (8–9) || None || 2,289 || 50–50
|- style="background:#bfb"
| 101 || August 2 || @ Reds || 7–5 || Bob Miller (2–1) || Ken Raffensberger (11–12) || Ken Heintzelman (2) || 2,428 || 51–50
|- style="background:#bfb"
| 102 || August 3 || @ Pirates || 5–4 || Robin Roberts (14–8) || Vern Law (3–7) || None || 13,607 || 52–50
|- style="background:#fbb"
| 103 || August 4 || @ Pirates || 3–7 || Murry Dickson (14–10) || Ken Johnson (2–2) || None || 7,206 || 52–51
|- style="background:#bfb"
| 104 || August 5 (1) || @ Pirates || 5–1 || Bubba Church (13–6) || Bob Friend (4–8) || None || see 2nd game || 53–51
|- style="background:#bfb"
| 105 || August 5 (2) || @ Pirates || 12–7 || Ken Heintzelman (5–8) || Ted Wilks (2–4) || Jim Konstanty (8) || 20,049 || 54–51
|- style="background:#bfb"
| 106 || August 7 (1) || Braves || 3–1 || Robin Roberts (15–8) || Max Surkont (9–9) || None || see 2nd game || 55–51
|- style="background:#bfb"
| 107 || August 7 (2) || Braves || 1–0 (15) || Ken Heintzelman (6–8) || Warren Spahn (13–10) || None || 19,125 || 56–51
|- style="background:#bfb"
| 108 || August 8 || Braves || 3–2 || Ken Johnson (3–2) || Jim Wilson (3–3) || Jim Konstanty (9) || 12,759 || 57–51
|- style="background:#fbb"
| 109 || August 9 || Braves || 4–5 || Chet Nichols (6–3) || Bubba Church (13–7) || None || 4,840 || 57–52
|- style="background:#bbb"
| – || August 10 || @ Giants || colspan=6 | Postponed (rain); Makeup: August 12 as a traditional double-header
|- style="background:#bfb"
| 110 || August 11 || @ Giants || 4–0 || Robin Roberts (16–8) || Jim Hearn (10–7) || None || 8,160 || 58–52
|- style="background:#fbb"
| 111 || August 12 (1) || @ Giants || 2–3 || Sal Maglie (16–5) || Jocko Thompson (3–7) || None || see 2nd game || 58–53
|- style="background:#fbb"
| 112 || August 12 (2) || @ Giants || 1–2 || Al Corwin (3–0) || Ken Johnson (3–3) || None || 17,072 || 58–54
|- style="background:#fbb"
| 113 || August 13 || @ Giants || 2–5 || Larry Jansen (15–9) || Bubba Church (13–8) || Dave Koslo (3) || 8,182 || 58–55
|- style="background:#fbb"
| 114 || August 14 || @ Braves || 2–4 || Chet Nichols (7–3) || Robin Roberts (16–9) || None || 5,578 || 58–56
|- style="background:#fbb"
| 115 || August 15 || @ Braves || 0–9 || Warren Spahn (14–11) || Ken Johnson (3–4) || None || 2,907 || 58–57
|- style="background:#fbb"
| 116 || August 17 || Giants || 5–8 || George Spencer (8–4) || Ken Heintzelman (6–9) || None || 20,683 || 58–58
|- style="background:#fbb"
| 117 || August 18 || Giants || 0–2 || Larry Jansen (16–9) || Robin Roberts (16–10) || None || 20,652 || 58–59
|- style="background:#fbb"
| 118 || August 19 || Giants || 4–5 || Al Corwin (4–0) || Ken Heintzelman (6–10) || None || 12,515 || 58–60
|- style="background:#bfb"
| 119 || August 21 || Cubs || 4–1 || Ken Johnson (4–4) || Cal McLish (3–8) || Bubba Church (1) || 7,683 || 59–60
|- style="background:#bfb"
| 120 || August 22 || Cubs || 4–0 || Robin Roberts (17–10) || Bob Rush (8–8) || None || 6,632 || 60–60
|- style="background:#fbb"
| 121 || August 24 || Pirates || 1–5 || Murry Dickson (17–11) || Jocko Thompson (3–8) || None || 8,847 || 60–61
|- style="background:#fbb"
| 122 || August 25 || Pirates || 2–3 (12) || Don Carlsen (2–0) || Jim Konstanty (4–11) || None || 5,276 || 60–62
|- style="background:#fbb"
| 123 || August 26 (1) || Reds || 2–4 || Ewell Blackwell (14–11) || Robin Roberts (17–11) || None || see 2nd game || 60–63
|- style="background:#bfb"
| 124 || August 26 (2) || Reds || 2–0 || Niles Jordan (1–0) || Willie Ramsdell (9–13) || None || 13,899 || 61–63
|- style="background:#bfb"
| 125 || August 27 (1) || Reds || 2–0 || Jocko Thompson (4–8) || Herm Wehmeier (2–9) || None || see 2nd game || 62–63
|- style="background:#bfb"
| 126 || August 27 (2) || Reds || 3–0 || Ken Johnson (5–4) || Ken Raffensberger (12–17) || None || 9,766 || 63–63
|- style="background:#fbb"
| 127 || August 28 || Cardinals || 0–2 || Max Lanier (9–8) || Bubba Church (13–9) || None || 9,048 || 63–64
|- style="background:#fbb"
| 128 || August 29 || Cardinals || 2–3 || Gerry Staley (15–13) || Ken Heintzelman (6–11) || Harry Brecheen (1) || 20,717 || 63–65
|- style="background:#fbb"
| 129 || August 30 || Cardinals || 3–6 || Al Brazle (4–2) || Niles Jordan (1–1) || Harry Brecheen (2) || 10,297 || 63–66
|-

|- style="background:#fbb"
| 130 || September 1 || Braves || 4–9 || Warren Spahn (18–11) || Ken Heintzelman (6–12) || None || 7,439 || 63–67
|- style="background:#bfb"
| 131 || September 2 || Braves || 5–3 (6) || Andy Hansen (2–0) || Dave Cole (1–4) || None || 5,544 || 64–67
|- style="background:#bfb"
| 132 || September 3 (1) || @ Giants || 6–3 || Robin Roberts (18–11) || Al Corwin (5–1) || None || see 2nd game || 65–67
|- style="background:#fbb"
| 133 || September 3 (2) || @ Giants || 1–3 || Dave Koslo (7–9) || Niles Jordan (1–2) || None || 31,397 || 65–68
|- style="background:#fbb"
| 134 || September 5 || @ Dodgers || 2–5 || Ralph Branca (13–6) || Ken Johnson (5–5) || None || 23,130 || 65–69
|- style="background:#bbb"
| – || September 6 || @ Dodgers || colspan=6 | Postponed (rain); Makeup: September 21
|- style="background:#fbb"
| 135 || September 7 || @ Dodgers || 6–11 || Preacher Roe (19–2) || Robin Roberts (18–12) || None || 12,589 || 65–70
|- style="background:#fbb"
| 136 || September 8 || @ Braves || 0–5 || Chet Nichols (9–6) || Bubba Church (13–10) || None || 2,629 || 65–71
|- style="background:#fbb"
| 137 || September 9 (1) || @ Braves || 4–5 || Warren Spahn (19–12) || Ken Johnson (5–6) || None || see 2nd game || 65–72
|- style="background:#fbb"
| 138 || September 9 (2) || @ Braves || 1–4 || Dave Cole (2–4) || Niles Jordan (1–3) || None || 8,588 || 65–73
|- style="background:#bfb"
| 139 || September 11 || @ Pirates || 3–2 || Robin Roberts (19–12) || Don Carlsen (2–3) || None || 8,152 || 66–73
|- style="background:#fbb"
| 140 || September 12 || @ Pirates || 6–8 || Vern Law (6–9) || Andy Hansen (2–1) || Ted Wilks (10) || 2,364 || 66–74
|- style="background:#bfb"
| 141 || September 14 || @ Reds || 10–4 || Bubba Church (14–10) || Willie Ramsdell (9–16) || None || 3,588 || 67–74
|- style="background:#bfb"
| 142 || September 15 || @ Reds || 5–2 || Niles Jordan (2–3) || Herm Wehmeier (5–10) || Robin Roberts (2) || 1,795 || 68–74
|- style="background:#fbb"
| 143 || September 16 || @ Cardinals || 2–9 || Gerry Staley (17–13) || Ken Johnson (5–7) || None || 11,942 || 68–75
|- style="background:#bfb"
| 144 || September 17 || @ Cardinals || 2–1 (10) || Robin Roberts (20–12) || Al Brazle (6–4) || None || 4,525 || 69–75
|- style="background:#fbb"
| 145 || September 18 || @ Cubs || 4–7 || Cal McLish (4–10) || Lou Possehl (0–1) || Johnny Klippstein (2) || 2,929 || 69–76
|- style="background:#bfb"
| 146 || September 19 || @ Cubs || 5–1 || Bubba Church (15–10) || Bob Rush (9–11) || None || 3,792 || 70–76
|- style="background:#bfb"
| 147 || September 21 || @ Dodgers || 9–6 || Robin Roberts (21–12) || Clem Labine (4–1) || None || 23,753 || 71–76
|- style="background:#bfb"
| 148 || September 22 || @ Dodgers || 7–3 || Karl Drews (1–0) || Don Newcombe (18–9) || None || 30,723 || 72–76
|- style="background:#fbb"
| 149 || September 23 || @ Dodgers || 2–6 || Preacher Roe (22–2) || Bubba Church (15–11) || None || 19,135 || 72–77
|- style="background:#fbb"
| 150 || September 25 || Giants || 1–5 || Jim Hearn (16–9) || Robin Roberts (21–13) || Sal Maglie (4) || 7,219 || 72–78
|- style="background:#fbb"
| 151 || September 26 || Giants || 1–10 || Larry Jansen (21–11) || Ken Johnson (5–8) || None || 14,009 || 72–79
|- style="background:#bfb"
| 152 || September 28 || Dodgers || 4–3 || Andy Hansen (3–1) || Carl Erskine (16–12) || None || 18,895 || 73–79
|- style="background:#fbb"
| 153 || September 29 || Dodgers || 0–5 || Don Newcombe (20–9) || Robin Roberts (21–14) || None || 28,408 || 73–80
|- style="background:#fbb"
| 154 || September 30 || Dodgers || 8–9 (14) || Bud Podbielan (2–2) || Robin Roberts' (21–15) || None || 31,755 || 73–81
|-

| style="text-align:left;" |
The second game on July 22 was suspended (Sunday curfew) after seven innings with the score 0–1 and was completed August 21, 1951, with new umpires.
The original game schedule indicated Philadelphia at Chicago for single games on July 29 and September 20.

 Roster 

 Player stats 

 Batting 

 Starters by position Note: Pos = Position; G = Games played; AB = At bats; H = Hits; Avg. = Batting average; HR = Home runs; RBI = Runs batted in Other batters Note: G = Games played; AB = At bats; H = Hits; Avg. = Batting average; HR = Home runs; RBI = Runs batted in Pitching 

 Starting pitchers Note: G = Games pitched; IP = Innings pitched; W = Wins; L = Losses; ERA = Earned run average; SO = Strikeouts Other pitchers Note: G = Games pitched; IP = Innings pitched; W = Wins; L = Losses; ERA = Earned run average; SO = Strikeouts Relief pitchers Note: G = Games pitched; W = Wins; L = Losses; SV = Saves; ERA = Earned run average; SO = Strikeouts Farm system 

LEAGUE CHAMPIONS: Wilmington, Grand Forks, Klamath Falls

References

External links
1951 Philadelphia Phillies season at Baseball Reference''

Philadelphia Phillies seasons
Philadelphia Phillies season
Philadelphia